Candlebox is the debut album by Seattle rock band Candlebox. It contains their best known hit, "Far Behind", as well as the hit singles "Change", "You" and "Cover Me". Released in 1993, the album has since been certified 4× platinum in the United States.

Promotion
The music videos for "Change", "Far Behind" and "You" remained in longstanding rotation on MTV and the latter became two of the most requested videos of 1993, and the former being featured on Beavis and Butt-Head.

Other songs were recorded during the Candlebox sessions and included on other releases. "Can't Give In," for instance, appears on the Airheads film soundtrack. "Pull Away" also served as a B-side to the "You" CD single.

Reception

The album has received mixed reviews. In a review for The Village Voice, although he gave the album a C rating, Robert Christgau panned Candlebox's self-titled album and called the band "postgrunge scenesuckers [who] aren't total pop-metal conformists--they're a tad more intense, with sharper drumming." Stephen Thomas Erlewine was more positive, writing for AllMusic: "Candlebox rode the alternative bandwagon to the top of the charts with their self-titled debut album." He also calls the singles "Change", "You" and "Far Behind" "the closest they come to memorable melodies."

Although released in July 1993, Candlebox did not enter the top 10 Billboard 200 until August 1994, upon the success of its third and biggest single "Far Behind", which would reach number 18 on the Hot 100 chart roughly a month later. The album peaked at number seven, Candlebox's highest position so far, and remained on the chart for 104 weeks.

Track listing
All tracks by Candlebox.

Personnel

Band
 Kevin Martin - lead vocals
 Peter Klett - guitar
 Bardi Martin - bass
 Scott Mercado - drums

Other
 Candlebox – producer, mixing
 Kelly Gray – producer, engineer, mixing
 Scott Heard – backing vocals
 Randy Gane – Hammond organ
 Janet Levinson – art direction
 Laurie Lewis – backing vocals
 Jon Plum – producer, engineer
 Kevin Westenberg – photography

Charts

Weekly charts

Year-end charts

Certifications

References

1993 debut albums
Candlebox albums
Maverick Records albums
Albums produced by Kelly Gray
Albums recorded at Robert Lang Studios